The 1916 Dartmouth football team was an American football team that represented Dartmouth College as an independent during the 1916 college football season. In its sixth and final season under head coach Frank Cavanaugh, the team compiled a 5–2–2 record and outscored opponents by a total of 206 to 47. Bernard Gerrish was the team captain.

Schedule

References

Dartmouth
Dartmouth Big Green football seasons
Dartmouth football